Boaz Bismuth (born 25 November 1964) is a member of the Israeli Knesset, a journalist and columnist who served as editor-in-chief of Israel Hayom between April 2017 and January 2022, and the former Israeli Ambassador to Mauritania between 2004 and 2008.

Biography 
Bismuth was born in Rehovot to Tunisian Jews, he studied in a Catholic elementary school in Jaffa, and in a high school owned by the Church of Scotland. Bismuth began his journalistic career in 1983, as a sports correspondent for Maariv until 1988, when he became its correspondent in Paris. Bismuth also taught journalism at the Moshe Sharret School in Paris.

During his journalistic career, Bismuth acquired a Bachelor's Degree in political science from Bar-Ilan University in 1984, and a Master's Degree from Sorbonne University in 1988. Additionally, he acquired a degree in African studies, specializing in cooperation with African countries in 1990. He also studied at the Centre d'Etudes Diplomatiques et Stratégiques.

In 1990, Bismuth began to work for Yedioth Ahronoth, and was its correspondent in Paris between 1990 and 2004, using his French passport to enter countries otherwise closed to Israeli nationals.

During this period, Bismuth reported from several Arab countries. In April 2004, Bismuth was appointed Israeli Ambassador to Mauritania by Minister of Foreign Affairs Silvan Shalom, where he served between July 2004 and  August 2008. During his tenure, Mauritania underwent several coups, and in 2008 the Israeli Embassy in Nouakchott was attacked by Al-Qaeda, who stated that Bismuth was the target of the attack.

From 2008 to April 2017, Bismuth served as the foreign affairs editor and correspondent for Israel Hayom, where on 30 April 2017 he replaced Amos Regev as the editor-in-chief. In March 2020 he became a commentator for HaHadashot 12, and in January 2022 he was removed from his position as editor-in-chief. On 25 July 2022, Bismuth announced that he would seek election to the Knesset as a member of the Likud, participating in Party list Primaries to be held by the party ahead of an upcoming legislative election.

Personal life
Bismuth is married to his third wife, Ruth, a formerly-Catholic convert to Judaism from France. He has four children and resides in Tel Aviv.

References

Living people
1964 births
University of Paris alumni
Bar-Ilan University alumni
Israeli columnists
Israeli opinion journalists
Yedioth Ahronoth people
Maariv (newspaper) people
Ambassadors of Israel to Mauritania
Israeli newspaper editors
Israeli people of Tunisian-Jewish descent
Members of the 25th Knesset (2022–)
Jewish Israeli politicians
Likud politicians